Blades is a town in Sussex County, Delaware, United States.  As of the 2010 census, the town population was 1,241, a 29.8% increase over the previous decade. It is part of the Salisbury, Maryland-Delaware Metropolitan Statistical Area.

History
Blades' population was 143 in 1900.

Geography
Blades is located at  (38.6356701, –75.6099270).

Demographics

At the 2000 census there were 956 people, 353 households, and 236 families living in the town. The racial makeup of the town was 69.77% White, 21.76% African American, 0.52% Native American, 1.05% Asian, 0.10% Pacific Islander, 3.97% from other races, and 2.82% from two or more races. Hispanic or Latino of any race were 6.59%.

There were 353 households, 36.3% had children under the age of 18 living with them, 41.6% were married couples living together, 19.5% had a female householder with no husband present, and 33.1% were non-families. 23.8% of households were made up of individuals, and 6.5% were one person aged 65 or older. The average household size was 2.70 people and the average family size was 3.23 people.

The age distribution was 29.2% under the age of 18, 9.2% from 18 to 24, 33.7% from 25 to 44, 20.9% from 45 to 64, and 7.0% 65 or older.  The median age was 33 years. For every 100 females, there were 88.6 males.  For every 100 females age 18 and over, there were 82.0 males.

The median household income was $28,864 and the median family income  was $33,194. Males had a median income of $25,139 versus $21,339 for females. The per capita income for the town was $13,495.  About 15.9% of families and 20.3% of the population were below the poverty line, including 30.1% of those under age 18 and 10.5% of those age 65 or over.

Education
Blades is in the Seaford School District. Its high school is Seaford Senior High School.

Transportation

Roads are the primary method of travel into and out of Blades. U.S. Route 13 (Sussex Highway) is the main highway serving the town, brushing the eastern edges on its way northward towards Dover and southwards towards Salisbury. Delaware Route 20 also brushes the northeast edge of town as it follows a generally east-west alignment through the region. DART First State operates the Route 212 bus that connects Blades with Delmar and Georgetown.  The Delmarva Central Railroad's Delmarva Subdivision line passes north-south along the western edge of Blades.

References

External links

Towns in Sussex County, Delaware
Towns in Delaware
Salisbury metropolitan area